The Central New York PGA Championship is a golf tournament that is the championship of the Central New York section of the PGA of America. The tournament has been played annually since 1963. With his victory in 2020, Eric Manning is the only five-time champion. No PGA Tour winner has also won the Central New York PGA Championship.

Winners

References

External links
PGA of America – Central New York section

Golf in Maryland
Golf in Virginia
Golf in Washington, D.C.
PGA of America sectional tournaments
Recurring sporting events established in 1932